What the Night Said is the debut album from Will Stratton. It was recorded the summer after his senior year of high school in a small recording studio in Astoria, Queens, New York, but not released until two years later.

Critical reception
The reception to the album was highly favorable. Allmusic has said that "Even though his songs seem to come from a nearly monkish vantage point of isolation, there is lifting beauty here, a need for connection, and breathtaking flights, swoops, and turns of melody." Evan Sawdey, for PopMatters, opined that Stratton, "ma[de] an album of songs that were custom-fitted for listening to at night," and that ultimately, "Stratton succeeds, and beautifully so."

Track listing
 "Katydid" - 2:33
 "So Ashamed" – 3:02
 "Fireflies" – 2:48
 "Night Will Come" – 3:45
 "Lost the Fear" – 2:52
 "I'd Hate to Leave You" – 2:58
 "Sonnet" – 2:20
 "Oh Quiet Night" – 2:19
 "Sleepwalk" – 1:59
 "Stay Awake" – 2:56
 "Sunol" – 2:53
 "I Don't Wanna Love" – 3:07

Personnel
Will Stratton - vocals, acoustic guitar, electric guitar, banjo, piano, harpsichord, Mellotron, synthesizer, bass guitar, hand claps
Sufjan Stevens - oboe
Tony Rogers - violin, cello
Sam Deutsch - violin
Michael Trepagnier - hand claps
Kieran Kelly - drums

References

2007 debut albums
Will Stratton albums